Leptosphaeria acuta (also known as nettle rash) is a plant pathogen.

References

External links
 Fungi of Great Britain and Ireland

Pleosporales
Fungi described in 1818
Fungi of Europe
Fungal plant pathogens and diseases